Miguel Ramírez de Salamanca, O.P. (died 1534) was a Roman Catholic prelate who served as Bishop of Santiago de Cuba (1530–1534).

Biography
Miguel Ramírez de Salamanca was born in Salamanca, Spain and ordained a priest in the Order of Preachers.
On 7 November 1530, he was appointed during the papacy of Pope Clement VII as Bishop of Santiago de Cuba. On 5 January 1533, he was consecrated bishop by Alfonso Manrique de Lara y Solís, Archbishop of Seville, with Baltasar del Río, Bishop of Scala, and Luis de Vivaldis, Bishop of Arbe, serving as co-consecrators.  He served as Bishop of Santiago de Cuba until his death in 1534.

References

External links and additional sources
 (for Chronology of Bishops)  
 (for Chronology of Bishops) 

16th-century Roman Catholic bishops in Cuba
Bishops appointed by Pope Clement VII
1534 deaths
Dominican bishops
Roman Catholic bishops of Santiago de Cuba
People from Salamanca